Marco Antonio Arriagada Quinchel (born  October 30, 1975 in Curicó) is a Chilean professional racing cyclist. He is the brother of cyclist Marcelo Arriagada. He carried the flag for his native country at the opening ceremony of the 2007 Pan American Games in Rio de Janeiro, Brazil. After a very successful opening to his 2011 season, which saw him take victories in Argentina, Chile and the Dominican Republic, Arriagada tested positive for the anabolic steroid stanozolol during the Vuelta de Chile. He later received a four-year ban.

Career highlights

1999
5th in General Classification Vuelta Ciclista de Chile (CHI)
2001
  National Road Race Championships
 4th in General Classification Vuelta Ciclista de Chile (CHI)
2002
  in Pan American Championships, Track, Individual Pursuit, Quito (ECU):
 1st in Stage 10 Vuelta Ciclista de Chile, Los Maitenes (CHI)
2003
 1st in General Classification Vuelta Ciclista Lider al Sur (CHI)
  National Time Trial Championships, Elite, Chile (CHI)
 2nd in National Championships, Road, Elite, Chile (CHI)
 1st in Stage 7 Vuelta Ciclista de Chile, Farellones (CHI)
 1st in General Classification Vuelta Ciclista de Chile (CHI)
  in Pan American Games, Track, Team Pursuit, Santo Domingo (DOM)
  in Pan American Games, Track, Individual Pursuit, Santo Domingo (DOM)
2004
 1st in Moscou, Points race (RUS)
 1st in Stage 2 part b Vuelta Ciclista Lider al Sur, Mafil (CHI)
 1st in Stage 3 Vuelta Ciclista Lider al Sur, Villarrica (CHI)
Vuelta Ciclista de Chile:
Winner stage 9
Winner General Classification
 3rd in Erondegem (BEL)
2005
 1st in Stage 10 Vuelta Ciclista Lider al Sur, Maitén (CHI)
 3rd in General Classification Vuelta Ciclista Lider al Sur (CHI)
Vuelta Ciclista de Chile:
 1st in Stage 3, Farellones (CHI)
 1st in Stage 6, Los Andes (CHI)
 3rd in General Classification
 1st in Mountains Classification
Pan American Championships, Mar del Plata (ARG):
  in Track, Team Pursuit, Elite
  in Track, Pursuit, Elite
  in Track, Points Race, Elite
2006
 1st in General Classification Termas Chillan (CHI)
 1st in Stage 9 Vuelta a Mendoza (ARG)
 1st in General Classification Vuelta a Mendoza (ARG)
 1st in Stage 3 part b Vuelta Ciclista Lider al Sur, Mafil (CHI)
 1st in Stage 9 Vuelta Ciclista Lider al Sur, Valle Nevado (CHI)
 2nd in General Classification Vuelta Ciclista Lider al Sur (CHI)
  national Road Race Championship
 1st in Stage 2 Vuelta Ciclista de Chile, Ovalle (CHI)
2007
 1st in Stage 5 Vuelta a Peru, Reparticion (PER)
 3rd in General Classification Vuelta a Peru (PER)
  national Road Race Championship
 1st in Stage 2 part b Vuelta Ciclista Lider al Sur, Mafil (CHI)
 1st in Mexico, Six Days, Aguascalientes (MEX)
 1st in General Classification Vuelta de Atacama (CHI)
  in Pan American Games (Team Pursuit), Rio de Janeiro (BRA)
2008
 1st in Stage 5 Vuelta de San Juan, Cerro Colorado (ARG)
2010
 1st Overall Volta do Parana
 1st Stage 1
 1st Stage 3
  National Time Trial Championships, Elite, Chile (CHI)
2011
 1st Overall Tour de San Luis

See also
 List of doping cases in cycling

References

External links
 
 

1975 births
Living people
Chilean male cyclists
Chilean sportspeople in doping cases
Doping cases in cycling
Chilean track cyclists
Cyclists at the 2003 Pan American Games
Cyclists at the 2004 Summer Olympics
Cyclists at the 2007 Pan American Games
Cyclists at the 1996 Summer Olympics
Cyclists at the 2008 Summer Olympics
Olympic cyclists of Chile
Vuelta Ciclista de Chile stage winners
People from Curicó
Pan American Games gold medalists for Chile
Pan American Games silver medalists for Chile
Pan American Games medalists in cycling
South American Games gold medalists for Chile
South American Games medalists in cycling
Competitors at the 2010 South American Games
Medalists at the 2003 Pan American Games
Medalists at the 2007 Pan American Games
20th-century Chilean people
21st-century Chilean people